Future generations are cohorts of hypothetical people not yet born. Future generations are contrasted with current and past generations, and evoked in order to encourage thinking about intergenerational equity. The moral patienthood of future generations has been argued for extensively among philosophers, and is thought of as an important, neglected cause by the effective altruism community. The term is often used in describing the conservation or preservation of cultural heritage or natural heritage.

The sustainability and climate movements have adopted the concept as a tool for enshrining principles of long-term thinking into law. The concept is often connected to indigenous thinking as a principle for ecological action, such as the seven generation concept attributed to Iroquois tradition.

Sources 
The term refers to the impact which the currently living generation has on the world which future generations will live in, the world they will inherit from humans living today. This concept is referred to in the most widely quoted definition of sustainability as a part of the concept sustainable development, is that of the Brundtland Commission of the United Nations on March 20, 1987: "sustainable development is development that meets the needs of the present without compromising the ability of future generations to meet their own needs."

The use of future generations in international law is in part recognized by the Charter of the United Nations which focuses on preventing the "scourge of war" on future generations. With the publication of UN Secretary-General's landmark Our Common Agenda report in September 2021, there has been a renewed interest in understanding, action for, and representing future generations in the multilateral system.

UNESCO declaration

Economics 

Most capitalist approaches assume future generations will have increased prosperity. However, given most economic decisions aren't forced to consider the impact on future generations, there's a lot of debate as to whether or not this has been or will be true in the future.

Legal rights of future generations 
Most implementations of future generations focus on enshrining the rights and needs of future generations in law, in order to represent those unable to voice their needs.

Several countries have tried enshrining obligations to future generations in law. In Wales, this moral obligation is encoded as a legal duty in the Well-being of Future Generations (Wales) Act 2015 and in the role of the Future Generations Commissioner. The first commissioner Sophie Howe modeled the role, proposing a number of new policies designed for future-thinking policy in Wales, including a 2020 Manifesto for the Future. Similarly in Hungary the office of the Hungarian Parliamentary Commissioner for Future Generations was established in 2008. While in the United Kingdom, an informal cross-party parliamentary group has been established to discuss issues around future generations.

Climate litigation 

The rights of future generations are increasingly being protected in legal precedents as part of the global trends in climate litigation. Future generations were the defendant in the critical defendants in a 2018 case Future Generations v. Ministry of the Environment and Others in Colombia which protected the Amazon rainforest basin for future generations.

In popular culture 
The rights of future generations were the inspiration for the principle plot device in Kim Stanley Robinson's The Ministry for the Future.

See also

 Generationism
Intergenerational equity
 Longtermism
 Think of the children

References

Cultural generations
Futures studies